The Emblem of East Turkestan (Uyghur: شەرقىي تۈركىستان دۆلەت گېربى) was adopted on 12 November 1933, when the Islamic Republic of East Turkestan declared independence. After the fall of the Islamic Republic, it became a symbol of the East Turkestan independence movement and appears on the official emblem of the East Turkistan Government in Exile.

Description
All of the elements featured in the emblem are in azure, which is the tincture of blue in heraldry.

Basmala

The basmala in the middle is stylised as a tughra.

Crescent
There is a crescent moon under the Basmala.

Three Stars
There is three stars on top of the emblem which represent three independent states which existed in or throughout the East Turkestan territory.
Turkic Khaganate
Uyghur Khaganate
Kara-Khanid Khanate

Circles
There are 18 circles with different sizes which represent 18 local tribes who lived in the territory, which also represent the moon cycle.
Pechinek 
Qipchaq
Oghuz
Basmil
Qay
Yabaqu
Tatar
Kyrgyz
Chigil
Toqsi 
Yaghma
Oghraq
Charuq
Chumul
Uyghur
Tangghut
Qitan
Qarluq

See also
First East Turkestan Republic
Flag of East Turkestan

References

Turkistan, East
East Turkestan independence movement
Turkestan, East